Alexander Law (28 April 1910 – after 1938) was a Scottish professional footballer who scored 41 goals from 77 appearances in the English Football League playing for Sheffield Wednesday, Brighton & Hove Albion and Chester. He was Brighton & Hove Albion's top scorer in the 1935–36 season with 27 goals in all competitions, and played twice for Chester in the 1939–40 Football League season abandoned because of the Second World War. Law was born in Bathgate, West Lothian, and played as a centre forward.

References

1910 births
Year of death missing
People from Bathgate
Place of death missing
Scottish footballers
Association football forwards
Sheffield Wednesday F.C. players
Brighton & Hove Albion F.C. players
Chester City F.C. players
Scottish Junior Football Association players
English Football League players
Fauldhouse United F.C. players
Footballers from West Lothian